Jon Ormond Newman (born May 2, 1932) is a senior United States circuit judge of the United States Court of Appeals for the Second Circuit.

Education and legal training

Born in New York City, New York, Newman earned his Artium Baccalaureus degree from Princeton University in 1953 and his Bachelor of Laws from Yale Law School in 1956. After Yale, he clerked for Judge George Thomas Washington of the United States Court of Appeals for the District of Columbia Circuit and then clerked for United States Supreme Court Chief Justice Earl Warren from 1957 to 1958. Additionally, he was in the United States Army Reserve from 1954 to 1962.

He was in private practice from 1958 to 1960 in Hartford, Connecticut and served as a graduate instructor at Trinity College. He also served as special counsel to the Governor of Connecticut in 1960. He was executive assistant to the United States Secretary of Health, Education, and Welfare from 1961 to 1962 and then joined the staff of United States Senator Abraham Ribicoff as administrative assistant from 1963 to 1964. He was the United States Attorney for the District of Connecticut from 1964 to 1969 when Richard Nixon took office. He entered private practice in Hartford again until 1971 when he was nominated to a federal district judgeship.

Federal judicial service

Newman was nominated by President Richard Nixon on December 2, 1971, to a seat on the United States District Court for the District of Connecticut vacated by Judge William H. Timbers. He was confirmed by the United States Senate on December 11, 1971, received his commission on December 15, 1971,and began serving as a judge on January 17, 1972. His service as a District Judge terminated on June 25, 1979, due to his elevation to the Second Circuit.

Newman was nominated by President Jimmy Carter on April 30, 1979, to the United States Court of Appeals for the Second Circuit, to a new seat created by 92 Stat. 1629. He was confirmed by the Senate on June 19, 1979, and received his commission on June 21, 1979. He served as Chief Judge from 1993 to 1997. He assumed senior status on July 1, 1997.

Honor

On December 8, 2016, at a special ceremony at the Supreme Court of the United States, Justice Elena Kagan presented to Judge Newman, on behalf of the federal judiciary, the 2016 Edward J. Devitt Distinguished Service to Justice Award. The Devitt Award honors an Article III judge who has achieved a distinguished career and made significant contributions to the administration of justice, the advancement of the rule of law, and the improvement of society as a whole.

Noteworthy decisions 

 Abele v. Markle, 351 F. Supp. 224 (D. Conn. 1972) - Connecticut statute prohibiting abortions, except to save life of mother, was unconstitutional. 
 SCM Corp. v. Xerox Corp., 463 F. Supp. 983 (D. Conn. 1978) - After 14-month jury trial, probably the longest federal civil jury trial, Xerox Corp. did not violate antitrust laws by maintaining its plain paper copying monopoly. [http://www.ca2.uscourts.gov:8080/isysnative/RDpcT3BpbnNcT1BOXDA2LTI0ODAtYWdfb3BuLnBkZg==/06-2480-ag_opn.pdf#xml=http://www.ca2.uscourts.gov:8080/isysquery/irlcb26/1/hilite
 Salinger v. Random House 811 F.2d 90 (2d Cir.1987) - J.D. Salinger's biographer used too many of the author's letters to be exempted from copyright infringement by the doctrine of "fair use"
 Kadic v. Karadzic, 70 F.3d 232 (2d Cir. 1996) – There was subject matter jurisdiction under the Alien Tort Claim Act, 28 U.S.C.S. § 1350, to pursue an action for war crimes against a private individual
 Leibovitz v. Paramount Pictures Corp., 137 F.3d 109 (2nd Cir. 1998) - poster for movie "Naked Gun 33 1/3" with photo of Demi Moore visibly pregnant and head of Leslie Nielsen replacing Moore's head and caption "Coming in February" was parody of Vanity Fair cover and exempt from copyright infringement as "fair use."
 United States of America v. Cromitie (Williams) (2nd Cir. 2013) (see 2009 Bronx terrorism plot)
 Trump v. Deutsche Bank (2019) 943 F.3d 627 (2nd Cir. 2019) - Deutsche Bank must hand over financial records of Trump and others to the House of Representatives. This ruling along with 2 others regarding Trump's financial records was heard by the Supreme Court in 2020, and held that the lower court had not adequately addressed separation of powers concerns in the rulings.

See also
 List of Jewish American jurists
 List of law clerks of the Supreme Court of the United States (Chief Justice)
 List of United States federal judges by longevity of service

References

Sources
 
 

|-

|-

1932 births
20th-century American judges
Hotchkiss School alumni
Judges of the United States Court of Appeals for the Second Circuit
Judges of the United States District Court for the District of Connecticut
Law clerks of the Supreme Court of the United States
Living people
Lawyers from Hartford, Connecticut
Lawyers from New York City
Military personnel from Hartford, Connecticut
Military personnel from New York City
Princeton University alumni
United States Attorneys for the District of Connecticut
United States court of appeals judges appointed by Jimmy Carter
United States district court judges appointed by Richard Nixon
Yale Law School alumni